The Rough Guide to the Music of Japan is a world music compilation album originally released in 1999. Part of the World Music Network Rough Guides series, the album presents an eclectic mix of the music of Japan ranging from traditional Japanese music (including Ryukyuan and Ainu music) to J-pop by artists of the 1990s.

Liner notes were written by Paul Fisher, a journalist and broadcaster specializing in Japanese music and founder of Far Side Music. Phil Stanton—co-founder of the World Music Network—produced the album. This release was followed by a second edition in 2008.

Critical reception

Alex Henderson of AllMusic called the album an "interesting and eclectic survey" that, like other albums in the series, "keeps us guessing and provides a variety of rewarding music along the way".

Track listing

References 

1999 compilation albums
World Music Network Rough Guide albums
World music albums by Japanese artists